The Sulphur Crisis of 1840 (also known as the Sulphur War of 1840 or Anglo-Neapolitan Sulphur Crisis) was a conflict between the Kingdom of the Two Sicilies and the United Kingdom. In the 19th century, the Kingdom of the Two Sicilies maintained a large sulphur mining industry and was responsible for most of the world's production. In industrialising, British demand for sulphur increased considerably. The nation had a very favourable treaty with the Two Sicilies, negotiated in 1816. The Sulphur Crisis of 1840 occurred when King Ferdinand II gave a monopoly of the sulphur industry to a French firm. The British argued it violated the 1816 trade agreement. A peaceful solution was eventually negotiated by France.

Background 
Sulphuric acid is one of the most important chemicals in the world. It is used to manufacture fertiliser, and is also important in mineral processing and oil refining. It has a wide range of end applications including as an electrolyte in lead-acid batteries and in dehydrating compounds. Demand surged during the industrial revolution, as the acid is used in finishing textiles. Between 1832 and 1836, sulphur production doubled. Until the invention of the Frasch process in 1891, sulphur extracted from volcanic rock in Sicily by the Sicilian method made up the vast majority of the world's production. In 1816, a treaty between the Two Sicilies and Great Britain was signed that gave British merchants large concessions, such as a 10% reduction in the customs duty due on imports from and exports to Britain, and gave British merchants a large advantage trading in Southern Italy. It also gave Britain most favoured nation status. The British defended their rights zealously and attempted to negotiate a new treaty that was even more favourable to them.

Crisis 
In 1836, then King of the Two Sicilies, Ferdinand II, began negotiating with French merchants an agreement granting French merchants control over the sulphur trade. An initial plan was submitted by French merchants Amato Taix and Arsene Aycard on 1 May 1836. Though many Sicilians supported the plan, it was abandoned after British resistance. In September 1837, Ferdinand II revived such talks with Taix and Aycard, regarding the production and export of sulphur. Ferdinand II was trying to encourage the price of sulphur to rise.

An agreement was approved by the Consultathe kingdom's general councilon 15 December 1837, announced on 4 July 1838, and signed on 9 July. It gave the Frenchmen control over sulphur exports from Sicily. It was essentially a monopoly, making it unprofitable for any other merchants to trade sulphur. This angered the British, who had previously controlled the trade. The agreement immediately crippled sulphur imports to the United Kingdom which fell from 44,653 tons in 1838 to 22,160 tons in 1839. The price of the sulphur also increased by 100%.

British merchants argued that the new agreement violated the 1816 treaty, and claimed that their commercial interests were damaged. In response, Lord Palmerston, the British Foreign Secretary began attempting to convince the Sicilian government to reverse the agreement. Ferdinand II resisted Palmerston's efforts, arguing that both agreements were comparable, and recognising that the new agreement could be highly profitable for his kingdom. The former opinion was supported by contemporary jurists Frederick Pollock and Joseph Phillimore. It was further impractical for Ferdinand II to cancel the contract, because if he did Taix and Aycard intended to claim £666,000 in compensation, a price that the kingdom would be hard pressed to pay.

On 23 February Ferdinand gave his minister, Prince de Cassaro, permission announce the cancellation of the contract. However, it never happened. In mid-March, the British warned that if their wishes were not met, they would establish a blockade and begin seizing merchant ships of the Sicilies. Reasoning that the kingdom's coastline was too large to effectively blockade, Ferdinand II refused to give in. Cassaro resigned from his post in frustration. Ferdinand II then began preparing for war. Palmerston ordered the Mediterranean Fleet to leave Malta and travel to the kingdom. In April, British Admiral Robert Stopford began seizing ships. Though there was no formal declaration of war, the 'Sulphur War' is generally accepted to have begun in April. Several Neapolitan merchants were searched and detained, but there were no direct naval confrontations between the two nations.

Klemens von Metternich, an Austrian diplomat, urged the two parties to avoid all-out war, writing to Sicilian diplomat Marquis de Gagliati: "Marquis, you must agree that it is hardly worth having a European war over a question of sulphur!" He criticised Ferdinand for being unwilling to negotiate. He then tried to convince Ferdinand to cancel the contract. In contrast to Metternich's efforts to negotiate, which were rejected, a similar offer by the French prime minister Adolphe Thiers was accepted by the British on 10 April and the Sicilians on 26 April. Also in late April, Stopford released the ships he had been holding and halted further seizures. As negotiations dragged on, Palmerston warned that seizures would resume if the contract was not cancelled by 20 July 1840. Ferdinand cancelled the contract on 21 July. On 29 July Stopford's fleet returned to Malta.

In December, British merchants were awarded 121,454 ducats out of the requested 373,978. The French were awarded 44,000 out of the requested 233,433 in 1844.

Notes 
Notes

Citations

References

Further reading 
 Davis, J. (1982). "Palmerston and the Sicilian Sulphur Crisis of 1840: An Episode in the Imperialism of Free Trade". Risorgimento 1 (2): 5–24.
 Sulphur War (1840) : a confrontation between Great Britain and the Kingdom of the Two Sicilies in the Mediterranean (thesis)

Kingdom of the Two Sicilies–United Kingdom relations
Conflicts in 1840
1840 in Europe
Sulfur
Blockades involving the United Kingdom